Kleiza is a Lithuanian language surname. Notable people with the surname include:

Linas Kleiza (born 1985), Lithuanian basketball player
Saulius Kleiza (born 1964), Lithuanian shot putter and discus thrower

Lithuanian-language surnames